Eichsfeld II is an electoral constituency (German: Wahlkreis) represented in the Landtag of Thuringia. It elects one member via first-past-the-post voting. Under the current constituency numbering system, it is designated as constituency 2. It comprises the eastern part of the district of Eichsfeld.

Eichsfeld II was created for the 1994 state election, replacing constituency Worbis I, which covered much of the same area. Since 2004, it has been represented by Christina Tasch of the Christian Democratic Union (CDU).

Geography
As of the 2019 state election, Eichsfeld II covers the eastern part of Eichsfeld district. It comprises the municipalities of Am Ohmberg, Breitenworbis, Buhla, Büttstedt, Dingelstädt Effelder, Gernrode, Großbartloff, Haynrode, Kirchworbis, Küllstedt, Leinefelde-Worbis (excluding Hundeshagen), Niederorschel (excluding Deuna, Gerterode, and Vollenborn), Sonnenstein, and Wachstedt.

Members
The constituency has been held by the Christian Democratic Union since its creation in 1994. Its first representative was Willibald Böck, who served from 1994 to 2004. Since 2004, it has been represented by Christina Tasch.

Election results

2019 election

2014 election

2009 election

2004 election

1999 election

1994 election

References

Electoral districts in Thuringia
Eichsfeld (district)
1994 establishments in Germany
Constituencies established in 1994